Tektitek may refer to:
the Tektitek people
the Tektitek language